Bothma is a surname. Notable people with the surname include:

Johannes Bothma (born 1988), South African cricketer
Michiel Bothma (born 1973), South African golfer
Myrtle Bothma (born 1964), South African hurdler
Renaldo Bothma (born 1989), South African-born Namibian rugby union footballer
Rinus Bothma (born 1989), South African rugby union player